The 2006 Rugby League Tri-Nations (also known as the Gillette Rugby League Tri-Nations due to sponsorship by Gillette) was the second Rugby League Tri-Nations tournament hosted by Australia and New Zealand. The tournament followed the same format as in 2004 and 2005, with each team meeting the other two teams twice, and the top two teams at the end of the group stages proceeding to the final. Australia was to run out winners in a tight final, winning in golden point extra time with Kangaroos captain Darren Lockyer scoring a try in the 87th minute.

The teams

Australia 
Coach: Ricky Stuart (Cronulla-Sutherland Sharks)
Assistant: Craig Bellamy

Great Britain 
Coach: Brian Noble (Wigan Warriors)

New Zealand 
Coach: Brian McClennan (Auckland Lions)

Venues 
The games were played at the following venues in Australia and New Zealand. The tournament final was played in Sydney.

Tournament matches 

This match was discounted after New Zealand were found guilty of fielding an ineligible player.

During the first minutes of the match Australian forward Willie Mason punched Stuart Fielden, breaking his nose and sparking a brawl, and later took Sean Long out after kicking, leading with an elbow which left Long's head bloodied and bandaged for the rest of the match. He was later charged for his punch on Fielden and had to face a Rugby League International Federation disciplinary committee the following Monday, where he was fined AUD$5000 and suspended for one game. After almost thirty minutes the Australians opened the scoring when, defending within their own ten-metre line, their scrum-half back Ben Hornby intercepted a pass and ran twenty metres before giving the ball on to winger Greg Inglis to run the remaining seventy to the line and score under the posts. Lockyer converted the try so it was 6 - 0 in favour of the Kangaroos. A few minutes later Irish winger Brian Carney left the field with a hamstring injury and was replaced by Lee Gilmour. Then Great Britain struck back with scrum-half-back Sean Long dummying his way through the defence thirty-five metres from the line then passing back inside to fullback Paul Wellens to score. Long then converted the try, so the scores were level at 6 all at the break.

On the other side of half-time, the Lions scored after about two minutes from close range when forward Jamie Peacock barged his way through the defence and over the line. The video referee gave the try 'benefit of the doubt' and Sean Long's kick didn't miss, so the score was 12 - 6 in favour of Great Britain. The Australians hit back with another long range try, the ball being moved out to Inglis on the left wing to make a break down the sideline before passing back inside to five-eighth Darren Lockyer to finish the run to the line and touch down behind the uprights. Lockyer then converted, levelling the score at 12 - 12. About ten minutes later the British struck back when Lee Gilmour hit a gap twenty metres out and ran through to dive over beneath the sticks. Sean Long converted so the Lions regained the lead at 18 - 12. With just over ten minutes remaining Great Britain got an opportunity to put themselves in front by more than a converted try when they were awarded a penalty, but Long's kick missed. Shortly after he got a chance to make amends with a drop goal but missed. However, with less than five minutes remaining he helped seal the match when he kicked a loose pass fifteen metres from his own goal-line downfield and chased after it, regathering and running just over the half-way line before passing it James Roby in support who couldn't outrun Nathan Hindmarsh. From the play-the-ball twenty metres away from Australia's goal-line, the British moved the ball through the hands out to the other side of the field to winger Gareth Raynor who dived over in the corner. Long's conversion attempt struck the post and missed, but he later kicked a field goal in the final minutes to make it a 23 - 12 victory, Great Britain's first in Australia since their 1992 tour.

This was the last match to be played against Australia by Great Britain before they split into England, Wales and Scotland.

Tournament standings

Final 

Early penalties for infringements in the ruck by the Kiwis, gave Australia an early two points from a Johnathan Thurston kick. The Kangaroos then mirrored this, conceding consecutive penalties that allowed Stacey Jones' goal a few minutes later to even the scores at 2 all. In the tenth minute Australia had the ball in the centre of the field and passed it out to Mark Gasnier who made a break down the right then passed to his winger Brent Tate to finish. Thurston's conversion was successful, so the home side led 8 - 2. Another penalty in the ruck in the twenty-first minute led to a minor scuffle and a goal from Thurston, extending the Kangaroos' lead to 10 - 2. Five minutes later New Zealand were ten metres into the Australians' half when Stacy Jones put a little chip kick over the heads of the Kangaroos for Brent Webb to run through and catch before drawing the defence and passing it on to Frank Pritchard who diver over untouched in the left corner. Jones missed the difficult conversion attempt, leaving the score 10 - 6 in favour of Australia. In the remaining ten minutes of play before half-time no more points were scored.

After five minutes the Kiwis had made their way down to Australia's ten-metre line when they moved the ball through the hands out to the right where Nigel Vagana threw a short ball back inside for Iosia Soliola charging through to score. The scores were level at 10 - 10 and Stacy Jones' kick missed. A few minutes later Australia were given a penalty and Thurston kicked for goal, regaining his side's lead 12 - 10. In the sixty-ninth minute the Kiwis picked up a penalty in front of the posts and Jones kicked it this time, levelling the scores at 12 - 12. The Kangaroos then survived several raids on their try-line and two field goal attempts before a Cameron Smith 40-20 kick brought them up to New Zealand's end with two minutes remaining where Thurston missed a drop goal attempt as well. Jones had another shot in the final minute, and Australia nearly scored a miraculous fifty-metre try, but the match was destined for golden point extra time.

The first five-minute period of extra time featured a missed field goal attempt each from Lockyer, then Jones. The teams then changed ends and started again. After eighty-seven minutes of test football, Australia gained possession of the ball. Thurston then received it thirty-five metres from his own in-goal and dummied his way through the defensive line. After running fifty metres he passed back inside to Darren Lockyer in support who was ankle-tapped on his way to the try-line and stumbled over under the posts, giving Australia a 16-12 golden-point victory.

Australia's victory regained them the Tri-nations trophy which they had lost to New Zealand in the final of the 2005 series in England. Lockyer, who in 2006 captained Queensland to victory in the State of Origin, winning the Wally Lewis Medal for player of the series, captained the Brisbane Broncos to victory in the 2006 NRL Grand Final, then won his second Golden Boot Award for international player of the year, collected the trophy.

The New Zealand loss brought down the curtain on the test careers of captain Ruben Wiki, who retired as New Zealand's most capped international, as well as Stacey Jones and Nigel Vagana.

Non-series matches 
During the series, Great Britain and New Zealand played additional matches to maintain their level of fitness.

See also 
 2006 in rugby league

References 

Rugby League Tri-Nations
Tri-Nations
Tri-Nations
Tri
2006
2006